Babella is a genus of very small sea snails, pyramidellid gastropod mollusks or micromollusks in the family Pyramidellidae within the tribe Chrysallidini (sensu taxonomy by Bouchet & Roctroi, 2005).

Description
The shell shows strong axial ribs between the sutures and three spiral keels, two of which are at the periphery, which falls in the deep sulcus between them, and one a little anterior to the middle of the base.

Distribution
The genus seems to be limited to tropical and temperate regions of the Pacific Ocean.

Life habits
Little is known about the biology of the members of this genus. As is true of most members of the Pyramidellidae sensu lato, they are ectoparasites.

Species
There are twelve known species within the genus Babella, these include:
 Babella affectuosa (Yokoyama, 1927)
 Babella caelatior (Dall & Bartsch, 1906) - synonym: Babella caelata (A. Adams, 1864)
 Babella caledonica Peñas & Rolán, 2017
 Babella ceciriana (Saurin, 1958)
 Babella claudoni (Dautzenberg & H. Fischer, 1907)
 Babella crassicostata (Saurin, 1958)
 Babella cylindrica (Saurin, 1958)
 Babella funiculata (Saurin, 1961)
 Babella gloria (Nomura, S., 1938)
 Babella glycisma (Melvill, 1899)
 Babella hastula (Saurin, 1961)
 Babella khmeriana (Saurin, 1962)
 Babella mariellaeformis (Nomura, 1938)
 Babella obliquissima (Saurin, 1959)
 Babella pallida Peñas & Rolán, 2017
 Babella planispiralis Peñas & Rolán, 2017
 Babella prominens Peñas & Rolán, 2017
 Babella ventricosa (Saurin, 1958)
 Babella yabei yabei Nomura 1936
 Babella yabei perarellia Nomura 1938
Species brought into synonymy
 Babella bartschi (Dautzenberg & Fischer, 1906): synonym of Egilina callista (Melvill, 1893)
 Babella caelata (A. Adams, 1863): synonym of Babella caelatior (Dall & Bartsch, 1906)

References

 Peñas A. & Rolán E. (2017). Deep water Pyramidelloidea from the central and South Pacific. The tribe Chrysallidini. ECIMAT (Estación de Ciencias Mariñas de Toralla) - Universidade de Vigo, 412 pp

External links
 Dall W.H. & Bartsch P. (1906). Notes on Japanese, Indo-Pacific and American Pyramidellidae. United States National Museum, Proceedings. 30(1452): 321-369, pls 17-26
 Gastropods.com: Babella; retrieved: 26 December 2011

Pyramidellidae
Taxa named by William Healey Dall
Taxa named by Paul Bartsch